The hydatid of Morgagni can refer to one of two closely related bodily structures:

 Appendix of testis (in the male)
 Paraovarian cyst (in the female)

Sexual anatomy
Mammal reproductive system